Bartolomeo Giuseppe "del Gesù" Guarneri (21 August 1698 – 17 October 1744) was an Italian luthier from the Guarneri family of Cremona. He rivals Antonio Stradivari (1644–1737) with regard to the respect and reverence accorded his instruments, and for many prominent players and collectors his instruments are the most coveted of all. Instruments made by Guarneri are often referred to as Del Gesùs.

Guarneri is known as del Gesù (literally "of Jesus") because his labels after 1731 incorporated the nomen sacrum, IHS (iota-eta-sigma) and a cross fleury. His instruments diverged significantly from family tradition, becoming uniquely his own style. They are considered equal in quality to those of Stradivari, and claimed by some to be superior. Guarneri's violins often have a darker, more robust, more sonorous tone than Stradivari's. Fewer than 200 of Guarneri's instruments survive. They are all violins, although one cello bearing his father's label, dated 1731, seems to have been completed by del Gesù. The quality and scarcity of his instruments have resulted in sale prices in excess of $10 million USD.

An asteroid has been named 19185 Guarneri in his honour.

Violin maker
The most illustrious member of the house of Guarneri, Bartolomeo was the son of Giuseppe Giovanni Battista, thus the grandson of Andrea Guarneri, both noted violin makers themselves. Andrea learned his trade as an apprentice of Nicolò Amati, to whom Stradivari was also apprenticed. Undoubtedly, Giuseppe learned the craft of violinmaking in his father's shop.

Giuseppe Guarneri's style has been widely copied by luthiers since the 19th century. Guarneri's career is a great contrast to that of Stradivari, who was stylistically consistent, very careful about craftsmanship and finish, and evolved the design of his instruments in a deliberate way over seven decades. Guarneri's career was short, from the late 1720s until his death in 1744. Initially he was thought to be a man of restless creativity, judging by his constant experimentation with f-holes, arching, thicknesses of the top and back and other design details. However, what has become clear is that, like other members of his family, he was so commercially overshadowed by his illustrious and business-savvy neighbor, Antonio Stradivari, that he was unable to command prices commensurate with his rival, hence needed to make more instruments and work hastily. Indeed, two of the five violin makers of the Guarneri family, the two Pietros—of different generations—left Cremona, the first for Mantua, the second for Venice, apparently because business prospects in Cremona were so stunted by the presence of Stradivari. From the 1720s until about 1737, Guarneri's work is quick and accurate, although he was not obsessed with quality of finish. However, from the late 1730s until his death, his work shows increasing haste and lack of patience with the time needed to achieve a high quality finish. Some of his late violins from circa 1742 to 1744 have scrolls that can be crudely carved, the purfling hastily inserted, the f-holes unsymmetrical and jagged.

Nonetheless, many of these late violins, in spite of the seeming haste and carelessness of their construction, possess a glorious tone and have been much coveted by soloists. His output falls off rather dramatically in the late 1730s, and the eccentricity of the works following that period gave rise to the romantic notion that he had been imprisoned for killing a rival violin maker (actually it was one of the Lavazza brothers in Milan to whom this occurred), and even the unlikely fiction that he made violins in prison. Such stories were invented during the nineteenth century and were repeated by the biographers of the Guarneri family, the Hills, in their 1931 work; while the Hills did not take them at face-value, it did feed into their idea that Giuseppe Guarneri del Gesù must have been temperamental and mercurial, rather than simply overworked and commercially unsuccessful. More recent data shows that business was so bad during the later period of his life that he had to relegate violin-making to the sideline and earn his living as an innkeeper (refuting the "prison" myth).

It has also become known that some of the violins emanating from his shop and bearing his label were actually the work of his German wife, Caterina Roda, who apparently returned to Germany after her husband's death in 1744. While every other member of his family, the Stradivari family, Nicolò Amati, and a peculiarly large number of makers, lived long lives—Stradivari living and working to age 93—Guarneri died at only 46. There is thus the possibility that the odd qualities of finish in his later instruments—ironically, those most highly prized and expensive—were due not only to stress and haste but also to encroaching illness. It is also worth noting that the tone of both Stradivari and Guarneri did not come into their own until late in the 18th century, that the high-built instruments of Amati and Stainer were the only ones prized during the 18th century. While it is true that players, then as now, preferred old instruments, Stradivari made one of the handsomest livings of all violin makers during his lifetime. It is also customary to conflate Stradivari and Guarneri in this regard, but even the Hills hinted that such was not the case in their styles, the Guarneri always bearing traces of Amati, and even Stainer, the latter Stradivari "would have none of." Moreover, Guarneri's instruments were recognized by a world-class soloist three decades before Stradivari's were likewise championed; by the 1750s, Gaetano Pugnani is known to have acquired and preferred a Giuseppe Guarneri del Gesù violin, but it is not until the 1780s that his pupil, Giovanni Battista Viotti, became an advocate of Stradivari instruments. Of course, Pugnani's advocacy is usually forgotten when Paganini became the most noted Giuseppe Guarneri player three generations later.

Accomplished violinists such as
Salvatore Accardo, 
Sarah Chang, 
Timothy Chooi,
Kyung-wha Chung, 
Eugene Fodor,
Augustin Hadelich, 
Jascha Heifetz, 
Joseph Joachim, 
Leila Josefowicz, 
Nigel Kennedy, 
Leonid Kogan, 
Henning Kraggerud, 
Fritz Kreisler, 
Gidon Kremer, 
Yang Liu,
Robert McDuffie, 
Anne Akiko Meyers, 
Midori, 
Elmar Oliveira, 
Ruth Palmer, 
Itzhak Perlman, 
Rachel Barton Pine, 
Maud Powell, 
Michael Rabin, 
Charlie Siem, 
Marie Soldat, 
Isaac Stern, 
Henryk Szeryng,
Arve Tellefsen,
Richard Tognetti, 
Uto Ughi, 
Henri Vieuxtemps, 
Aaron Rosand,
Eugène Ysaÿe,
Kerson Leong,
Zvi Zeitlin,  
Pinchas Zukerman, and
Yi-Jia Susanne Hou have used Guarneri del Gesù violins at one point in their career or even exclusively.

Virtuoso Niccolò Paganini's favorite violin, Il Cannone Guarnerius of 1743, and the Lord Wilton of 1742, once owned by Yehudi Menuhin, are del Gesù instruments. In addition, the Vieuxtemps Guarneri—once owned by Henri Vieuxtemps—was sold in 2013 close to its asking price of $18 million USD, making it the most expensive instrument in the world. Jascha Heifetz owned a c. 1740 Guarneri del Gesù from the 1920s until his death in 1987. It was his favorite instrument, even though he owned several Stradivaris. One of Norwegian virtuoso Ole Bull's favorite instrument was the del Gesù violin of 1744 named after Bull, which is also believed to be the last work of Guarneri del Gesù.

Instrument list
(From the Cozio Archive)

Billotet-Guilet, c. 1715–22, Cozio 40680
Frank, Sin, Tonhalle, c. 1715–22, Cozio 44918
Rappoldi, Campbell, c. 1715–22, Cozio 49179
Möller, Moskowsky, c. 1715–22, Cozio 61284
Chang, 1717, used by Sarah Chang. (This instrument is often questioned. But it has been verified that this is indeed a Guarneri del Gesù.)
Möller, Samsung, c. 1722–26, Cozio 41155
NY Philharmonic, c. 1722–26, Cozio 45560
Folinari, c. 1725, Cozio 32443, in private use
Count de Vière-Cheremetieff, Balokovic, c. 1725–29, Cozio 43700
Zimmermann, Aerson, c. 1725–29, Cozio 44520
Prnjat 1726, now in the RTCG
Colin, Kogan, 1726, Cozio 40682
Dancla, Serato, c. 1726–29, Cozio 40409
Milstein, Nathan, 1727, Cozio (previously listed)
Robberechts (Robrecht), 1728, Cozio 44054
Corti, Tolstopiatow, Lvoff, c. 1728, Cozio 42441
Kubelik, von Vecsey, c. 1728, Cozio 71858, used by Alexandra Conunova
'Lady Stretton', 1728–29, Cozio 40126 used by Albert Stern and Elmar Oliveira
Cobbett, Downs, c. 1729, Cozio 60188
Baron Heath, 1729, Cozio 42986
Briggs, 1730, Cozio 61283
Baron Vitta, c. 1730, Cozio 40391
David, Payne, c. 1730, Cozio 40388
Pluvié, Champonay, Kahn, c. 1730, Cozio 40392
Lord Shaftsbury, c. 1730–31, Cozio 47533
Castelbarco-Tarisio, c. 1732, Cozio 43676, now in collection at the Chimei Museum. Yu-Chien Tseng (at age 20) won the silver prize (gold not awarded) at the 2015 XV International Tchaikovsky Competition with this violin.
'The Cathedral', George Enescu, 1731. In 2008, after a competition organized by the Romanian Ministry of Culture and Religious Affairs and the Romanian National Museum "George Enescu", the violin has been entrusted to violinist Gabriel Croitoru and is again played in concerts.
Messeas (Cello), 1731, Cozio 40385
Baltic, 1731, Cozio 40410
Sorkin, Mischakoff, 1731, Cozio 42178
Marteau, Habisreuthinger, 1731, Cozio 45112, owned by Henri Marteau, then Gérard Poulet and used by Maxim Vengerov.
Huberman, 1731, used by Midori Goto, on lifetime loan from the Hayashibara Foundation
Stanley Goodman, c. 1731, Cozio 41968
Geneva, Turettini, c. 1731, Cozio 47740
Lo Stauffer, Zukerman, c. 1731, Cozio 40803
Gibson, Huberman, 1731, Cozio 40406
Armingaud/Fernández Blanco, 1732, on display at Mueso de Arte Hispanoamericano "Isaac Fernández Blanco", Buenos Aires, Argentina
Ferni, 1732, Cozio 47698
Adolphe Sax, 1732, now in the Paris Conservatory of Music
Posselt, Phillip, 1732, owned by Ruth Posselt, now in a private collection
Mayseder, 1732, Cozio 42355
Kreisler, Nachez, 1732, Cozio 40549
Balokovic, Haupt, 1732, Cozio 40397
Pixis, 1732, Cozio 43699
Rode, von Heyder, c. 1732, Cozio 40389
Jean Becker, 1732, Cozio 43270
Gillot, Lord Dunmore, c. 1732, Cozio 40395
Dittrich, c. 1732, Cozio 40218
Plotenyi, Remenyi, 1732, Cozio 40394
Parlow, Henryk Kaston, 1732, Cozio 41966
Fritz Kreisler, 1733, Cozio 40400, given to Library of Congress in 1952
Lafont-Siskovsky, 1733, Cozio 40399
Consolo, 1733, Cozio 44397
1733, Cozio 47475
Soil, 1733, Cozio 42723
Hämmerle, 1733, Cozio 43920
Prince Doria, 1733–34, Cozio 46922, acquired by the Doria Family from Jacquot of Paris in 1860
Haddock, 1734, Cozio 40411
Spagnoletti, 1734, Cozio 46715
Rode, 1734, Cozio 40404
Heberlein, le Guillet, 1734, Cozio 49613
Pugnani, 1734, Cozio 40402
Ferni, duc de Camposelice, 1734, Cozio 43826
1734, Cozio 61313
Hart, Kreisler, c. 1734, Cozio 40551
Lo Stauffer, 1734, displayed by the City of Cremona
Plowden, 1735, Cozio 40418
Sennhauser, 1735, Cozio 40089
David, 1735, Cozio 40618
Parlow, Viotti, 1735, Cozio 40420
Ladenburg, Odnoposoff, 1735, Cozio 40121
Antoncich, Ward, 1735, Cozio 40450
Chardon (Small Violin), 1735, Cozio 40421
'The King', 1735, Cozio 40407, now in the Croatian Academy of Sciences and Arts
Kubelik, Ferni, 1735, Cozio 40419, used by Kyung-Wha Chung
Ladenburg, 1735, played by Robert McDuffie
Mary Portman, 1735, Cozio 40088, on loan to Ben Beilman (from Clement and Karen Arrison through the Stradivari Society of Chicago)
d'Egville, Prince Wilhelm of Prussia, Menuhin, 1735, Cozio 40417. Now in collection of David L. Fulton.
Wieniawski, 1736, Cozio 43840
Muntz, Bustabo, 1736, Cozio 49615
Count Cessol, 1736, Cozio 40422
Pollitzer, Koessler, 1736, Cozio 43519
Lafont, c. 1736, Cozio 41035
Paulsen, 1737, Cozio 47249
Joachim, 1737, Cozio 40412
Zimbalist, 1737, Cozio 48357
'King Joseph', 1737, Cozio 40213, reportedly the first Guarnerius del Gesù to go to America in 1868, now in collection of David L. Fulton
Lipinski, 1737, owned by Daniel Hope
Isaac Stern, Panette, Balatre, 1737, Cozio 40214. Once in the collection of David L. Fulton, now owned by a banking institution in Lugano, and used by Renaud Capuçon
Fountaine, 1738, Cozio 47065
Kemp, Emperor, 1738, Cozio 40426. Now in collection of David L. Fulton.
Haas, Soriano, 1738, Cozio 45258
Adam, Wurlitzer, 1738, Cozio 40425, played by Vesko Eschkenazy
Maggio, Huberman, 1738, Cozio 66000
Baron Gutmann, Baron Knoop, c. 1738, Cozio 42440
Kortschak, Wurlitzer, Hammig, Spanish Joseph, 1739, Cozio 40428
Museum, 1739, Cozio 43701
Ebersholt, Menuhin, 1739, Cozio 40595, in collection of Kunsthistorisches Museum
Beare, Steinhardt, 1739, Cozio 49617
Bower, Druian, 1739, Cozio 44345
1739, Cozio 61377. Now in private collection of an anonymous German and lent to Lisa Batiashvili.
Lutti, Senn, 1740, Cozio 40430
Fountaine (Small Violin), 1740, Cozio 4327
Ysaÿe, 1740, Cozio 40064, used by Isaac Stern, now belonging to Nippon Music Foundation
David, 1740, used by Jascha Heifetz, now in the San Francisco Legion of Honor Museum
Casadesus, c. 1740, Cozio 48178
Pestel, Menuhin, c. 1740, Cozio 49624
Rebner, Bonjour, c. 1740, Cozio 40432
Heifetz, David, c. 1740, Cozio 40097
Baron d'Erlanger, c. 1740–41, Cozio 45387
Kochánski, 1741, Cozio 42807, used by Aaron Rosand, sold for about $10 million in 2009
Carrodus, 1741, Cozio 40255
Henry Holst, 1741, Cozio 44998
Playfair, 1741, Cozio 50382
1741, Cozio 49618
Doubleday, Duvette, 1741 (in Ingles & Hayday catalogue)
Vieuxtemps, 1741, called the "Mona Lisa" of violins, Cozio 40433. Owned by a private collector who bequeathed lifetime use of the instrument for performances to violinist Anne Akiko Meyers.
Vieuxtemps, Wilmotte, c. 1741, Cozio 50024
Duc de Camposelice, c. 1741, Cozio 40548
c. 1741 "Titan," on loan to Canadian-American violinist Timothy Chooi
Lipinski, c. 1742, Cozio 40424
Moser, 1742, Hamma & Co. Cozio 48180
Wieniawski, 1742, Cozio 40090, on loan to Taiwanese-American violinist Paul Huang (2015 Avery Fisher Career Grant recipient) through the Stradivari Society.
Donaldson, McAllister, Sorobin, c. 1742, Cozio 40429
Segelman, 1742, Cozio 40623
Tellefsen, 1742, Cozio 40403
Dragonetti, Walton, 1742, Cozio 43830
Benno Rabinof, 1742, Cozio 55051
Alard, 1742, Cozio 40444, now in Cité de la Musique, Paris
Lord Wilton, 1742, Cozio 40256, used by Yehudi Menuhin, now in collection of David L. Fulton
Dushkin, 1742, Cozio 40446, used by Pinchas Zukerman
Soldat, 1742, Cozio 40445, used by Rachel Barton Pine
Brusilow, 1743, Cozio 49626
Spalding, 1743, Cozio 45063
Sauret, 1743, Cozio 40253
Burmester, Kanarievogel, Hammerle, 1743, Cozio 42987
Baron Heath, 1743, Cozio 43582
Il Cannone, 1743, Cozio 40130, used by Niccolò Paganini, now in the City Hall of Genoa
Carrodus, Hottinger, 1743, Cozio 40447, used by Richard Tognetti.
Leduc, c. 1744, Cozio 40448, used by Henryk Szeryng, since 2019 played by Augustin Hadelich
Sainton, Betti, c. 1744, Cozio 40434
Doyen, 1744, Cozio 40436, currently held by Henry Ford Foundation
Edith Lorand, Columbus, Terminator, 1744, Cozio 49625
Prince of Orange, Wald, Hoffmann, 1744, Cozio 42581, displayed by the Prague National Museum
Lord Coke, 1744, Cozio 40415
de Bériot, 1744, Cozio 43991
Cariplo, Hennel, Rosé, 1744, used by Arthur Grumiaux Cozio 41962
Ole Bull, 1744, Cozio 40453, now in collection at the Chimei Museum, acquired in 1992. In catalogue of Ingles & Hayday and Artes-Violins, Milano, 2010. One of Ole Bull's favorite violins, it is also believed to be the last work of Guarneri del Gesù.

References

Notes

Sources 
 
 
 
 
Walter Hamma, Meister Italienischer Geigenbaukunst, Wilhelmshaven 1993, 
List of Guarneri instruments, cozio.com
List of Guarneri instruments, guarneri.net
 "The Henry Hottinger Collection", The Strad, October, 1965.
 Capolavori di Antonio Stradivari, Charles Beare, Arnoldo Mondadori S.p.A., Milan, 1987.
 A Thousand Mornings of Music, Arnold Gingrich, Crown Publishers, New York, 1970.
 Antonius Stradivarius, Dirk J. Balfoort, The Continental Book Company, Stockholm, 1945.
 Berühmte Geigen und ihre Schicksale, P. J. Tonger, Köln, 1919.
 Die Geigen und Lautenmacher vom Mitteralter bis zur Gegenwart, Willibald Leo von Lütgendorff, Frankfurter Verlags-Anstalt, Frankfurt am Main, 1922.
 Italian Violin Makers, Karel Jalovec, Paul Hamlyn, London, 1964.
 Italian Violin-Makers, Karel Jalovec, Orbis, Prague, 1952.
 Italienische Geigenbauer (1957), Karel Jalovec, Artia, Prague, 1957.
 Loan Exhibition of Stringed Instruments and Bows Commemorating the 70th Birthday of Simone Fernando Sacconi, Schuler Verlagsgesellschaft, Stuttgart, 1966.
 Meisterwerke Italienischer Geigenbaukunst, Fridolin Hamma, Hamma & Co., 1932.
 The Violin: Its physical and acoustic principles, Paolo Peterlongo, Paul Elek, London, 1979.
 "Eighteenth-Century Connections Through Musical Instruments", Gary Sturm, Journal of The Violin Society of America, Vol. IX, No. 2, 1988.
 "Exhibition of Violins and Bows in the Smithsonian Collection", Gary Sturm, Journal of The Violin Society of America, Vol. V, No. 2, Spring, 1979.
 "Guided Tour of the Library of Congress Collection of Stringed Instruments", Robert Bein, Journal of The Violin Society of America, Volume XVII, No. 2, November 4–7, 1999.
 "Ne Plus Ultra", John Dilworth, The Strad, December 1987.
 36 Famous Italian Violins, Alex Wasinski, Herman Gordon, New York, 1975.
 Evelyn & Herbert Axelrod Stringed Instrument Collection, Herbert Axelrod, 2002.
 Italian Violin-Makers, Karel Jalovec, Orbis, Prague, 1952.
 Beautiful Italian Violins, Karel Jalovec, Paul Hamlyn, London, 1963.
 The Miracle Makers, Bein & Fushi, Chicago, 1998.

1698 births
1744 deaths
Luthiers from Cremona